The Hunchback of Notre Dame is a 1966 British television series, an adaptation of the 1831 novel by Victor Hugo, directed by James Cellan Jones.  It starred Peter Woodthorpe as Quasimodo and Gay Hamilton as Esmeralda.  The screenplay was by Vincent Tilsley. Although some photographs exist, no recordings of the production are known to have survived.

Cast
 Peter Woodthorpe as Quasimodo
 Gay Hamilton as Esmeralda
 James Maxwell as Claude Frollo
 Wilfrid Lawson as King of the Beggars
 Gary Raymond as Pierre Gringoire
 Alexander Davion as Captain Phoebus
 Emrys Jones as Charmolue
 Suzanne Neve as Fleur de Lys
 Derek Baker as Torturer
 Beatrix Lehmann as Gudule
 Jeffrey Isaac as Beggar
 Ray Mitchell as Cathedral chorister

Episode titles
Episode 1 "Abduction" 8 March 1966
Episode 2 "Torture" 15 March 1966
Episode 3 "Seduction" 22 March 1966
Episode 4 "Interrogation" 29 March 1966
Episode 5 "Accusation" 5 April 1966
Episode 6 "Repentance" 12 April 1966
Episode 7 "Retribution" 19 April 1966

External links
 

1960s British drama television series
1966 British television series debuts
1966 British television series endings